André Wilms (29 April 1947 – 9 February 2022) was a French film and television actor who also appeared in German and Finnish films. Wilms was the winner of the Best Supporting European Actor award at the 1992 European Film Awards for his work in Aki Kaurismäki's La Vie de bohème. He died on 9 February 2022, at the age of 74.

Selected filmography
 Le tartuffe (1984)
 Field of Honor (1987)
 Life Is a Long Quiet River (1988)
 A Strange Place to Meet (1988)
 Monsieur Hire (1989)
 Europa Europa (1990)
 La Vie de Bohème (1992)
 Leningrad Cowboys Meet Moses (1994)
 Juha (1999)
 Tanguy (2001)
 A Piece of Sky (2002)
 Brocéliande (2002)
 Roses à crédit (2010)
 Le Havre (2011)
 Americano (2011)
 A Villa in Italy (2013)
 Superegos (2014)
 The Missionaries (2014)
 Pause (2014)
 The Forbidden Room (2015)
 Voyage en Chine (2015)
 Marie Curie: The Courage of Knowledge (2016)
 Hannah (2017)
 Le sel des larmes (2019)
 Maigret (2022)

References

External links

 

1947 births
2022 deaths
20th-century French male actors
21st-century French male actors
Actors from Strasbourg
French male television actors
French male film actors
French male stage actors
French theatre directors
Officiers of the Ordre des Arts et des Lettres
European Film Awards winners (people)